The Frans Hals Museum is a museum located in Haarlem, the Netherlands.

The museum was established in 1862. In 1950, the museum was split in two locations when the collection of modern art was moved to the Museum De Hallen (since 2018 called Hal). The main collection, including its famous 17th-century Frans Hals paintings, for which the museum is named, is located in the former Oude Mannenhuis on the Groot Heiligland.

The museum was founded in 1862 in the newly renovated former Dominican church cloisters located in the back of the Haarlem city hall known as the Prinsenhof, and when it needed more space, it moved to the recently vacated location of the town orphanage in 1913.  The collection is based on the large number of paintings owned by the City of Haarlem, which includes over 100 artworks seized from Catholic churches in the 1580s after the Protestant Reformation, and Haarlem art rescued from demolished local buildings from the 15th century onwards.

In 2018 the museum re-merged with Museum De Hallen to form a single museum called the Frans Hals Museum with two locations: Hof (located on Groot Heiligland) and Hal (located on Grote Markt).

History of the Old Men's Almshouse 

The Haarlem Oude Mannenhuis was a hofje founded in 1609. The residential rooms were situated around a courtyard in the style of contemporary Haarlem Hofjes. Each of the thirty little houses was inhabited by two men; to be eligible to living there they had to be at least 60 years old, honest Haarlem residents, and single. They were required to bring their own household goods listed as a bed, a chair with a cushion, a tin chamberpot, three blankets, six good shirts and six nightcaps. They were locked in each night at eight o'clock in the summer and at seven in the winter. The residents had to make a weekly collection with a poor-box, and a statue of a man holding this can be seen in the entrance hall of the museum. The old men's home was governed by five regents, whose portraits, painted by Frans Hals in 1664, are on display.

Though the men's home dates from 1609, only the main hall is still mostly intact. During the intervening centuries the complex was renovated beyond recognition, most notably by the previous inhabitants, the Haarlem municipal orphanage which made use of the complex from 1810 until 1908, when it moved to the Coen Cuserhof. During the French occupation, the old men still living in the hofje were moved a block away to the present-day Proveniershuis, when the art collections of the two institutions were merged. The art of both locations, as well as the art of several other former Haarlem institutions, is now in the Frans Hals museum collection. The most notable artworks from the Oude Mannenhuis are the two group portraits of regents and regentesses by Frans Hals. The inventory of the Proveniershuis was drawn up by Pieter Langendijk and though some of the paintings have since been reattributed, his list is largely intact. The impressive regents' rooms have been rebuilt from other Haarlem locations. A room on the street side has a curious keystone above the door with masonic symbols denoting a mason's society and the text 'Metsselaars Proef-Kamer 1648 12/29'.

History of the collection 

The older pieces of the museum collection, consisting of primarily religious themes, are Haarlem relics from the Reformation, when all Roman Catholic art was formally seized by the city council in 1648. Frans Hals himself worked as the first official city-paid restorer for some of these pieces. The city council then proceeded in the 17th century to rewrite Haarlem history, and purchased various large pieces to decorate the city hall, telling stories such as the legend of Damiate, or the legend of the Haarlem Shield. During this time the city hall functioned as a semi-public museum, though the term didn't even exist yet. The first signs of an official museum with a curator occurred when the Dutch Society of Science, founded in 1752, started to rent the Prinsenhof room of the city hall in 1754 for its meetings and began to furnish it as a Cabinet of curiosities. From an inventory list in the city archives it can be seen that they used as a model for their system of naming and presentation, the book Amboinsche Rariteitkamer by Georg Eberhard Rumphius. They shared the room with the Synod of the Dutch Reformed Church, that used it once every six years for its meetings. They hired a woman for the dusting and serving tea, and in 1768 they hired a man as curator, who was responsible for the entire collection and the medical Hortus garden in the yard.

The spacious room soon proved too small for the number of donated artifacts it received from its members, thanks to the increase in shipping and associated travel. In the late 18th century and early 19th century, Haarlem became a bedroom community of Amsterdam, with many wealthy bankers becoming members of the young Society. The old paintings became just a colorful backdrop for chests filled with stuffed animals and prepared specimens. In 1777 the Society moved its overflowing collection to a renovated house on the Grote Houtstraat, where the new young curator Martin van Marum would live the rest of his life. This building, situated next to the Mennonite church, was mortgaged with the Mennonite banker Pieter Teyler van der Hulst, who was not a member of the Society, but who created his own arts society and whose later testament would be the basis for the Teylers Museum, where van Marum would also become curator.

This move essentially split the collection, and the natural history half is currently in the collection of the Teylers Museum. Though the paintings and the garden remained back at city hall, 40 years after Carl Linnaeus had published his Systema Naturae no one was interested in the garden (which was set up as a living version of that book), and still fewer people were interested in the religious art. The city hall was seen as a depot of large pieces of historical importance, and the next large group of paintings to join the collection occurred when Napoleon disbanded the guilds in the Netherlands in 1794. The guilds' property reverted to the state. This is how the larger pieces that Hals painted for the guilds came into the collection. Without an official curator, the painting collection was only available to be seen by appointment with the city clerk, a situation that has remained up to the present day for the large pieces still located there, such as the whalebone from Willem Barentsz trip to Nova Zembla or the portrait of Kenau Simonsdochter Hasselaer.

Collection as of 1862

In the mid-19th century the back cloisters were given an extra floor for additional showing space, and it was at this time that the museum opened its doors to the public via a separate entrance than the main city hall entrance. This was also the first time that all the group portraits could be shown hanging near each other. No works of modern art were bought at that time, and the decision to form the museum was to cater to the visitors of other Haarlem museums. At the time, modern art could be seen at the nearby Teylers Eerste Schilderijenzaal in Teylers Museum, and also in the gallery of the Museum voor Levende Nederlandsche Meesters, otherwise known as the Haarlemsche Paviljoen, a museum that was open from 1838 until 1885 in the former home of Henry Hope he called Villa Welgelegen. The art critic Victor de Stuers was very angry about Haarlem being the location of such museums, as there was no artistic climate there to speak of. He criticized the collection at the Paviljoen for lacking works by contemporary painters such as "Israëls, Bosboom, Bles, Bisschop, van de Sande Bakhuijzen, Bakker Korff, and Alma Tadema", and though works by these painters were already on view at Teylers at the time, the Frans Hals museum collection only has a few paintings by the first two in their collection today. Stuers also felt it was a scandal that the city fathers in charge of the municipal museum made no effort to stop the sale of a portrait of Willem van Heythuijzen to the Brussels museum in 1872.

Thus this antiquated collection is the one that was transferred to the Groot Heiligland in 1913, and large pieces that were not in the cloisters at that time, such as the painting by Dirck Ferreris installed in the mayor's room, remained at city hall. A few of these were formally given to the museum in 1962, such as The Banquet of the Officers of the St Adrian Militia Company in 1627 and The Officers of the St Adrian Militia Company in 1630. In 1962 when the museum celebrated its 100th anniversary as a municipal collection, the collection had already been split again into a modern and a classical one, with the modern art housed in a new wing on the north side of the complex. Today the modern art is displayed in the Verweyhal. The museum celebrated its 100th anniversary on the Groot Heiligland in 2013 with a Frans Hals exhibition that included reproductions being placed around the city in original locations.

Collection on display 

Aside from several works by Hals and other artworks originally from the collections of many former guilds, monasteries and churches of Haarlem, the collection of over 750 works also includes objects relating to Haarlem that have been acquired by local donations and purchases. The museum is specialized in restoration and research on the works of Haarlem painters in the 17th century and of the painters of the 16th century who taught them to paint, most notably Jan van Scorel, Maerten van Heemskerck, Hendrick Goltzius and Cornelis van Haarlem. In the late 19th century the museum became something of a pilgrimage site for young impressionists, who were fascinated by the loose brushwork visible in the two group portraits of regents by Hals that he painted when he was in his eighties. This is the reason that after the move to the present location in 1913, the museum took on the name of Frans Hals as these were considered the most prominent paintings of the collection at the time. The museum is still famous for group portraits by Hals, but since the group portraits from the military guilds were cleaned in the early 20th century, it is these which most visitors come to see today. Most of the objects and paintings can not be displayed for lack of space, and the museum rotates its collection through exhibitions at various locations in Haarlem, though works by some prominent painters cannot be lent out and remain in storage.

Installed art from other Haarlem locations

Several stately rooms saved from torn-down Haarlem houses have been partially reconstructed and a collection of Haarlem silver saved from various local churches can be seen in the former regent rooms of the almshouse, which now seem much grander than they were originally. The windows have been decorated with art by anonymous Haarlem glass artists, most of which has been acquired through municipal demolitions work. Spread along the corridors are beautiful Dutch tiles from local salvage operations that have been installed along the walls, accompanied by 17th century furniture including clocks, chairs, and chests.

The museum as an institution is only responsible for its collection, which is mostly oil paintings. Other applied art that has been installed is the responsibility of the municipal culture department, and the museum rents the premises from them. This is the reason that visitors are offered much more information about the paintings than about other aspects of the building, including the objects in the courtyard.

List of painters 

Between 1605 and 1635 over 100,000 paintings were produced in Haarlem. Not all of these have survived, and most have left town, but this does say something about the artistic climate in the city. At that time art ownership in the city was 25%, a record high. More art has survived up to today from that period in Haarlem than from any other Dutch city, thanks mostly to the Schilder-boeck published by Karel van Mander there in 1604. The former curator Pieter Biesboer has created inventories of Haarlem art and worked on several catalogues for the museum, mostly based on the works created before 1800.

What follows is a list of the prominent painters through the centuries on display in the museum.

 Jan van Scorel, 1495–1562
 Maarten van Heemskerck, 1498–1574
 Karel van Mander, 1548–1606
 Hendrick Goltzius, 1558–1617
 Cornelis Cornelisz van Haarlem, 1562–1638
 Floris Claesz van Dijck, 1575–1651
 Cornelis Claesz van Wieringen, 1580–1633
 Frans Hals, 1582–1666
 Dirck Hals, 1591–1656
 Willem Claeszoon Heda, 1594–1680
 Pieter Claesz, 1597–1660
 Johannes Cornelisz Verspronck, 1597–1662
 Salomon de Bray, 1597–1664
 Pieter Saenredam, 1597–1665
 Salomon van Ruysdael, 1600–1670
 Adriaen Brouwer, 1605–1638
 Judith Leyster, 1609–1660
 Jan Miense Molenaer, 1610–1668
 Bartholomeus van der Helst, 1613–1670
 Jan Steen, 1625–1679
 Jan de Bray, 1627–1697
 Jacob van Ruisdael, 1628–1682
 Gerrit Adriaenszoon Berckheyde, 1638–1698

See also
Pride and Joy: Children's Portraits in The Netherlands 1500-1700 art exhibition by the Frans Hals Museum in 2000

References

External links 

De Hallen Haarlem 
Frans Hals Museum within Google Arts & Culture

 
1862 establishments in the Netherlands
Art museums and galleries in the Netherlands
Art museums established in 1862
Hofjes
Museums in Haarlem
Rijksmonuments in Haarlem
Frans Hals
19th-century architecture in the Netherlands